The United States Air Force's  232d Combat Communications Squadron (232 CBCS) is an Air National Guard combat communications unit located at Abston Air National Guard Station, Montgomery, Alabama.

Mission

Federal mission 
The 232 CBCS' federal mission is to provide combat-ready forces for deployment of command, control, and communications-computer (C4) systems for contingency and OPLAN taskings.

State Mission
The 232 CBCS' state mission is to protect the lives and property of citizens of the state and to generally assure public safety within the borders of the state.

History

Lineage

Previous designations
 Constituted as the 232d Airways and Air Communications Service Operations Flight on 26 March 1952 and allotted to the Air National Guard
 Activated on 25 September 1952
 Federally recognized on 26 September 1952
 Redesignated 232d Airways and Air Communications Service Flight, Mobile on 1 October 1953
 Redesignated 232d Mobile Communications Flight (Heavy) on 1 July 1961
 Inactivated on 14 March 1966
 Constituted as the 232d Mobile Communications Squadron (Bare Base) on 1 January 1966 and allotted to the Air National Guard
 Activated on 15 March 1966
 Federally recognized on 16 March 1966
 Redesignated 232d Combat Communications Squadron (Tactical Airbase) in 1976
 Redesignated 232d Combat Information Systems Squadron on 1 July 1985
 Redesignated 232d Combat Communications Squadron in 1986

Assignments

Major Command / Gaining Command
 Air National Guard / Military Air Transport Service (1952-1961)
 Air National Guard / Air Force Communications Service (later Air Force Communications Command) (1961-1992)
 Air National Guard / Tactical Air Command (later Air Combat Command) (1992-2009)
 Air National Guard / Air Force Space Command (2009-2018)
 Air National Guard / Air Combat Command (2018-present)

Aligned Headquarters Unit
 8106th Air Base Squadron (1952-1953)
 117th Tactical Reconnaissance Wing (1953-1966)
 251st Mobile Communications Group (later 251st Combat Communications Group) (1966-1971)
 226th Mobile Communications Group (later 226th Combat Communications Group) (1971-unknown)
 254th Combat Communications Group (unknown-unknown)
 226th Combat Communications Group (unknown-present)

Components

Stations
 H&R Holding Point, Montgomery, Alabama (1952-1953)
 Dannelly Field Air National Guard Base, Montgomery, Alabama (1953-unknown)
 Montgomery Air National Guard Station, Montgomery, Alabama (unknown-1997)
 Abston Air National Guard Station, Montgomery, Alabama (1997-present)

Awards and campaigns

Combat Communications 0232
Squadrons of the United States Air National Guard
Military units and formations in Alabama